"Il y a trop de gens qui t'aiment" is the name of a 1999 song recorded by French artist Hélène Ségara. It was the first single from her second studio album, Au Nom d'une Femme, on which it features as first track. Released in November 1999, the song became a hit in Belgium (Wallonia) and France, topping the singles charts.

Music and lyrics
The song was written by Christian Vié and the music composed by Thierry Geoffroy.

This ballad deals with a love that is not shared: indeed, in the lyrics, Ségara observes the man she loves, and describes his actions, but as he is surrounded by many other people, he does not pay attention to her. The text "contrasts the coldness of the remoteness of the person loved and the narrator's thwarted love".
 
The song is characterized by a "stripped orchestration" and a "romantic monotony in the repetitive chords" played on piano. In the refrain, Ségara sings in the high notes, accompanied by strings, expressing her suffering. The song ends with a solo played on violin that seems to express the singer's resignation.

Performances and cover versions
Ségara sang twice "Il y a trop de gens qui t'aiment" during her first tour named Au Nom d'une Femme. The live version is included on her album En concert à l'Olympia, which also contains a version in Spanish-language, under the title "Yo lo siento per mi", written by Nilda Fernandez. The song was also part of many French compilations, such as Hits de diamant, released in 2007.

In 2002, the song was covered by Roch Voisine, Muriel Robin and Patrick Fiori for Les Enfoirés's album 2002: Tous dans le même bateau, as 13th track in a 3:44 version.

Chart performances
In France, the song appeared on the singles chart at number 41 on November 13, 1999, then climbed to number 18, but was first unable to reach the first positions. It managed to enter the top ten in its ninth week and finally top the chart for two not consecutive weeks, in its 12th and 15th weeks. Then it dropped slowly on the chart, totaling 14 weeks in the top ten, 32 weeks in the top 50 and 36 weeks in the top 100. It was certified Platinum by the SNEP and was the 15th best-selling singles of 2000.

In Belgium (Wallonia), the single was very successful too. It entered at number 38 on December 4, 1999, reached the top ten in its sixth week and topped the chart for seven weeks. After that, it dropped rather quickly, after 12 weeks in the top ten and 23 weeks on the chart (top 40). It was ranked number nine on the 2000 Annual Chart.

Track listing
 CD single

 Digital download

Personnel

 Lyrics and music: C.Vie and T.Goeffroy
 Programmation and orchestral direction: Michel Cœuriot
 Mixing: Stéphane Briand at Guillaume Tell Studio
 Drum kit: Laurent Faucheux
 Bass: Laurent Verneray
 Guitar: Thomas Cœuriot
 Synth programmation: Celmar Engel
 Keyboards: Michel Cœuriot

 Strigs direction: Anne Gravoin
 Violins: Anne Gravoin, Hélène Blazy, Françoise Perrin, Jean-Philippe Kuzma, Anne Morel, Daniel Dato, Véronique Engelhard, Arnaud Nuvolone, Anne Villette, Jean-Lou Descamps and Thomas Tercieux
 Alto: Fanny Coupe, Christophe Gaugue, Christine Jaboulay and Setrag Koulaksezian
 Cello: Mathilde Sternat, Frédéric Lagarde and Jean-Claude Auclin
 Editions: Bambino

Charts and sales

Peak positions

Year-end charts

Certifications and sales

References
Notes

External links
"Il y a trop de gens qui t'aiment", lyrics + music video

1999 singles
Hélène Ségara songs
Ultratop 50 Singles (Wallonia) number-one singles
SNEP Top Singles number-one singles
Pop ballads
1999 songs
East West Records singles